Donald Nally (born December 27, 1960) is an American conductor, chorus master, and professor of conducting, specializing in chamber choirs, opera, and new music. He is conductor of the professional new-music choir, The Crossing, based in Philadelphia. He teaches graduate students at Northwestern University's Bienen School of Music.

Nally has been chorus master of Lyric Opera of Chicago, Welsh National Opera, Opera Philadelphia, and the Festival dei Due Mondi in Spoleto, Italy.

He has been nominated seven times for the Grammy Award for Best Choral Performance, winning in 2018 and 2019.  He has won numerous awards and is recognized as one of the leading commissioners of new music in the United States.

Early life and education
Nally was born in Hilltown, Pennsylvania, and educated at the University of Cincinnati College-Conservatory of Music (BM, music education), Westminster Choir College (MM, choral conducting), and the University of Illinois (DMA, choral conducting). He has been Artist in Residence at Washington and Lee University and Shorter University, has been on the faculty of the University of Illinois, and has been guest lecturer at Indiana University and the College-Conservatory of Music at the University of Cincinnati.

Professional life
Nally’s first professional chamber choir was The Bridge Ensemble which sang concerts 1996-1997; though it failed financially, it established a significant presence in Philadelphia, receiving a great amount of critical attention and laying the groundwork for the success of The Crossing.

From 1998 to 2002, he was Artistic Director of the Choral Arts Society of Philadelphia, during which time the chorus received Chorus America’s 2002 Margaret Hillis National Award for Excellence and was chosen as “The Best of Philadelphia” by Philadelphia Magazine.

At the end of 2002, Nally left Philadelphia and moved to Wales to become the chorus master at Welsh National Opera. In 2006, Nally returned to the United States to become the chorus master for the Lyric Opera of Chicago.

Nally has guest conducted the Swedish Radio Choir, the Latvian State Choir, the Grant Park Symphony Chorus, and the Santa Fe Desert Chorale; he has prepared choirs for the New York Philharmonic, the Los Angeles Philharmonic, Philharmonia Orchestra, the BBC Symphony Orchestra, the Philadelphia Orchestra (including the world premiere of Hannibal’s One Heart Beating), the Pennsylvania Ballet, the Illinois Symphony Orchestra, and Spoleto USA. Nally collaborates often on living-art installations with the artists Allora & Calzadilla, with scores by David Lang, which have been staged in Frankfurt, Osaka, Edmonton, Cleveland, Córdoba, London, Philadelphia, and Houston. He was music director for Lang's The Mile-Long Opera, overseeing a thousand singers on The High Line in Manhattan.

The Crossing 

The ensemble began in 2005 when Nally and a group of friends sang an informal concert together. At the end of the 2010-11 season, Nally left Lyric Opera of Chicago and moved back to Philadelphia to focus on his Philadelphia ensemble, The Crossing, which specializes in contemporary works. It has received numerous awards, including the Chorus America/ASCAP Award for Adventurous Programming (2009, 2011 & 2017), the American Composers Forum 2017 Champion of New Music Award, the 2018 Grammy Award for Best Choral Performance, and the 2019 Grammy Award for Best Choral Performance.

Northwestern University 
In September 2012, Nally joined the faculty of the Bienen School of Music at Northwestern University in Evanston, Illinois as a tenured professor and director of choral organizations.  He was appointed following the retirement of longtime professor Dr. Robert A. Harris, who held the position for the 35 years previous to Nally's appointment.  Upon arriving in Evanston in the fall of 2012 Nally founded the chamber choir BCE, a premier group of 26 singers dedicated to performing choral music of the 21st century and drawing relationships to its polyphonic roots in early music – primarily that of the Renaissance.

The ensemble has sung several times on the Chicago Symphony Orchestra MusicNOW series and appeared at both of Chicago's Ear Taxi festivals.

In 2013, Nally rehearsed Howard Hanson's Song of Democracy, which sets texts from various poems of Walt Whitman. An African American student objected to performing the work because he claimed Whitman was racist. Nally told the student he would receive a failing grade if he did not perform the work. The student claimed that a failing grade would have led to the loss of his scholarship.

Awards and distinctions 
 2022 Nomination Grammy Award for Best Choral Performance for Rising w/ The Crossing (The Crossing)
 2021 Nomination Grammy Award for Best Choral Performance for Carthage (The Crossing)
 2020 Nomination Grammy Award for Best Choral Performance for The Arc in the Sky (The Crossing)
 2020 Nomination Grammy Award for Best Choral Performance for Voyages (The Crossing)
 2019 Honorary Doctorate, Rider University
 2019 Grammy Award for Best Choral Performance for Zealot Canticles (The Crossing)
 2018 Grammy Award for Best Choral Performance for The Fifth Century (The Crossing)
 2017 Champion of New Music Award with The Crossing from American Composers Forum
 2017 Michael Korn Founders Award for Development of the Professional Choral Art from Chorus America
 2017 Nomination Grammy Award for Best Choral Performance for Bonhoeffer (The Crossing)
 2012 Louis Botto Award for Innovative Action and Entrepreneurial Zeal from Chorus America
 2002 & 2015 Margaret Hillis National Award for Excellence in Choral Music (Choral Arts Society of Philadelphia, 2002 and The Crossing, 2015)

Works

Publications
 "Gian Carlo Menotti: A Centennial Tribute", Voice Prints: Journal of the New York Teachers’ of Singing Association (January–February 2011).
 Conversations with Joseph Flummerfelt: Thoughts on Conducting, Music and Musicians (2010, Scarecrow Press)
 "To immerse myself in words: Text and Music in the Choral Works of Samuel Barber." DMA dissertation, University of Illinois, 1995.
 "Barber's Op. 42: The poetry and music as key to his musical animus; Part I: Laurie Lee's Twelfth Night; Part II: Louise Bogan's To be sung on the water." Choral Journal 47.4 (October 2006).

Musical Compositions
 Eclipse (2021), composed with Kevin Vondrak, on the poetry of Angela Jackson, an outdoor work for choir, lakefront, and full moon
 You Can Plan on Me (2020), for SATB choir at Christmas
 The Forest (2020), composed with Kevin Vondrak, an outdoor work for choir and ECHOES amplification kits
 Jesus Christ the Apple Tree (2003), for SATB choir

Discography
John Luther Adams, Sila: The Breath of the World, The Crossing with JACK Quartet (Cantaloupe Music, 2022)
Born, The Crossing (Navona Records, 2022)
Words Adorned, The Crossing with Dalal Abu Amneh and Al-Bustan Takht Ensemble (Navona Records, 2021)
The Tower and the Garden, The Crossing (Navona Records, 2021)
Rising w/ The Crossing, The Crossing (New Focus Recordings, 2020)
James Primosch, Carthage, The Crossing (Navona Records, 2020)
Michael Gordon, Anonymous Man, The Crossing (Cantaloupe Music, 2020)
Julia Wolfe, Fire in my mouth, The Crossing with New York Philharmonic and Young People's Chorus of New York City (Decca Gold, 2019)
Voyages, The Crossing (Innova Records, 2019)
Kile Smith, The Arc in the Sky, The Crossing (Navona Records, 2019)
Evolutionary Spirits, The Crossing (Navona Records, 2019)
Lansing McLoskey, Zealot Canticles, The Crossing (Innova Records, 2018);2019 Grammy Award for Best Choral Performance 
If There Were Water, The Crossing (Innova Records, 2018)
John Luther Adams, Canticles of the Holy Wind, The Crossing (Cantaloupe Music, 2017)
Ted Hearne, Sound from the Bench, The Crossing (Cantaloupe Music, 2017)
Edie Hill, Clay Jug, The Crossing (Navona Records, 2016)
Seven Responses, The Crossing with International Contemporary Ensemble (Innova Records, 2016)
Gavin Bryars, The Fifth Century, PRISM Saxophone Quartet and The Crossing (ECM Records, 2016); 2018 Grammy Award for Best Choral Performance 
Thomas Lloyd, Bonhoeffer, The Crossing (Albany Records, 2016); Grammy-nominated in the category of Best Choral Performance, 2017
Gregory W Brown: Moonstrung Air, The Crossing, New York Polyphony (Navona Records, 2015)
Lewis Spratlan, Hesperus is Phosphorus, Network for New Music and The Crossing (Innova Records, 2015)
Christmas Daybreak, The Crossing, The Choir of St. Paul's Church (Chestnut Hill) (Innova Records, 2013)
I Want to Live, The Women of The Crossing (Innova Records, 2013)
It Is Time, The Crossing  (Navona Records, 2011)
Kile Smith, Vespers, Piffaro, The Renaissance Band and The Crossing  (Navona Records, 2008)
   Gian Carlo Menotti, The Saint of Bleecker Street, Choir and Orchestra of the Festival dei Due Mondi (Chandos, 2002)
   Gian Carlo Menotti, Cantatas, Choir and Orchestra of the Festival dei Due Mondi (Chandos, 2002)
Choral Music of Longing and Lament, The Bridge Ensemble (Bridge Ensemble, 1997)

Notes

1960 births
Living people
American male conductors (music)
American writers about music
University of Cincinnati – College-Conservatory of Music alumni
University of Illinois at Urbana–Champaign School of Music alumni
Westminster Choir College alumni
West Chester University faculty
21st-century American conductors (music)
21st-century American male musicians